Paul "Pablo" Wilson (born 20 October 1978) is a Scottish musician, who is best known as the bass guitarist for Scottish-Northern Irish alternative rock band Snow Patrol. He previously played guitar in Glasgow band Terra Diablo from 2000–2005. In March 2005, he replaced bassist Mark McClelland in Snow Patrol and switched instruments to bass. Wilson has been friends with the band years before he joined them and even Terra Diablo, and had contributed guitar and keyboards as an unofficial live member. He plays left-handed and generally uses a black Rickenbacker on-stage. He is a multi-instrumentalist and is trained in piano.

Career
Wilson, was born and grew up in Kinlochleven and attended the Kinlochleven High School. He always wanted to be a musician and has said that it is the only thing "he's ever done". He has said that if he couldn't be a musician, he would have worked as a music producer or teach children how to be in a band. Wilson is a multi-instrumentalist, and can play instruments such as piano, guitar, bass, drums and banjo. He went to music school to learn the piano, and in his own words, can "play most things unless they have to be blown into". He has been friends with members of Snow Patrol since 1995, during their "wilderness years".

In 2000, he joined Glasgow band Terra Diablo as guitarist. Whenever Terra Diablo supported Snow Patrol on tours, Wilson joined Snow Patrol on-stage as an unofficial member, contributing guitar and keyboards. He once joked that he agreed to tour with Snow Patrol only the condition that Terra Diablo could tour with them. Wilson left Terra Diablo in mid-February 2005, the reasons for which were not made public. On 16 March 2005, Snow Patrol bassist Mark McClelland was fired from the band. Vocalist Gary Lightbody asked Wilson to replace him. He accepted, and switched to the bass guitar when he joined the band. He played his first show as permanent member in Dingle on 1 April 2005. In October 2006, during the Eyes Open Tour, he injured his left arm and shoulder. Though wanting to continue, the band thought better and six concerts were subsequently cancelled.

Apart from his work with Snow Patrol, Wilson also guested on Film School's 2007 album Hideout.

Musical style

His favourite instrument is the guitar, which he played for nineteen years, before switching to bass. He found the transition difficult, as he felt that one could "get away with more" playing the guitar. He finds the bass a difficult and challenging instrument to play and "express" oneself. But he enjoys playing it and likes the potential of the instrument: "By changing one note, you can make the whole thing sound a lot better". Apart from writing bass-lines for the band, Wilson occasionally contributes guitar and piano parts. He writes bass-lines based on the song's rhythm and at times teams up with drummer Jonny Quinn to come up with a basic riff or simple chord changes.  He plays the bass left-handed, and prefers using a pick. On-stage, he generally uses a black Rickenbacker 4000 bass.

Personal life
As a child, Wilson was a huge fan of Star Wars, and owned toys of all characters. He has the name of his previous band "Terra Diablo" tattooed on the inside of his left arm.

Musical equipment
Bass guitars
Rickenbacker 4000 (Black)
Rickenbacker 4003
Fender Jazz Bass

Amplifiers
Ampeg SVT–2PRO, SVT–4PRO
Orange AD200
Ampeg SVT–810E (Bass cabinet)

Effects
Big Muff (distortion pedal, 2×)
Line 6 Bass POD XT Pro

Discography

with Terra Diablo
2001 – "The Way Things Are and How They're Meant to Be"
2002 – "The Smoke"
2004 – "Satellites"
2004 – "Swings & Roundabouts"
2004 – Terra Diablo

with Snow Patrol
2006 – Eyes Open
2008 – A Hundred Million Suns
2009 – Up to Now
2011 – Fallen Empires
2018 – Wildness
Notes

A: When credited.

References

External links
Profile at Ampeg.com

1978 births
Living people
Scottish multi-instrumentalists
British rock bass guitarists
Scottish bass guitarists
Snow Patrol members
Scottish keyboardists
21st-century bass guitarists